In Igbo mythology, Ahia Njoku, also known as Ifejioku, Aha Njoku, is a goddess worshipped by the Igbo people of Nigeria.

She is responsible for yams, which were an important ingredient in the Igbo diet, and the men who care for them (Farming yams is a traditionally male job in the Igbo tribe unless one is weeding or harvesting). The Ahanjoku Festival is celebrated
among the Igbo people on a full moon before the New Yam Festival.In some parts children who were dedicated to the service of the deity were named Njoku. As adults, such children were expected to become prosperous yam farmers, which made them into nobility. The name gives you a nature that believes in the phrase - "larger than life".
It is this nature that makes you a leader, visionary and a equally grand organizer

See also
Njoku Ji

References

Agricultural goddesses
Igbo goddesses